Gas City, Ltd. was an independent gas retailer in the United States. It was started in 1966 in Chicago, and opened over 75 locations in northeast Illinois, northwest Indiana, Florida, Arizona, and Wisconsin. The headquarters was located in Frankfort, Illinois, which also kept a fiberglass cow that was used to advertise the sale of milk at its first location in Chicago.

Gas City filed for bankruptcy in October 2010, with all assets auctioned off in April 2011. It closed its last locations on May 12, 2011.

Gas stations in the United States
Defunct oil companies of the United States
Defunct companies based in Illinois
Companies based in Will County, Illinois
American companies established in 1966
Non-renewable resource companies established in 1966
Non-renewable resource companies disestablished in 2011
Retail companies established in 1966
Retail companies disestablished in 2011
1966 establishments in Illinois
2011 disestablishments in Illinois